Jeanie Riddle (born c. 1954) is an American politician from Missouri. A Republican, she served as a member of the Missouri House of Representatives from the 49th District in Callaway County. She is currently serving as a member of the Missouri Senate from the 10th District which includes the counties of Audrain, Callaway, Lincoln, Monroe, Montgomery and Warren.

Personal history
Riddle is a 1972 graduate of McCluer High School in Florissant, Missouri. She received her higher education at Drury College in Springfield, earning a Bachelor's Degree in Education in 1976. Following college, she worked briefly in St. Louis in the accounting department of Southwestern Bell Telephone Company. In 1977, Riddle moved to Callaway County where she took a job as teacher and coach for the South Callaway R-II school district for 28 years. Riddle has two grown children — a son and a daughter and four grandchildren.

Political career
Riddle was first elected to the Missouri House in 2008. She ran unopposed and was reelected in 2010, and was once again reelected to the newly drawn 49th district in 2012. She was then elected to the Missouri Senate in 2014 representing the 10th district. 
In her last term in the House, she served as Chair of the Rules Committee and was also a member of the Utilities committee and the Emerging Issues in Health Care committee.  In 2010, she was elected by her fellow caucus members to serve as the Assistant Majority Floor Leader through 2012. In her first term, Riddle served as vice-chair of the Public Safety committee as well as a member of the Tax Reform, Energy and Environment committees, also the Appropriations-Public Safety and Corrections subcommittee.

Currently, Riddle serves as Chairwoman of the Joint Committee on Capitol Security, Chairwoman of the Joint Committee on Child Abuse and Neglect, Chairwoman of the Professional Registration Committee, and Vice-Chairwoman of the Seniors, Families and Children Committee.

Electoral history

State Representative

State Senate

References

Women state legislators in Missouri
Republican Party Missouri state senators
Republican Party members of the Missouri House of Representatives
Living people
Drury University alumni
1950s births
21st-century American politicians
21st-century American women politicians